Joseph Warner may refer to:

 Joseph E. Warner (Massachusetts  politician) (1884–1958), American politician and judge in Massachusetts
 Joseph E. Warner (Michigan politician) (1870–1956), member of the Michigan House of Representatives
 Joseph Warner (priest), Irish Anglican priest
 Joseph Warner (surgeon) (1717–1801), British surgeon